The 1943 San Diego mayoral election was held on April 20, 1943 to elect the mayor for San Diego. Appointed incumbent mayor Howard B. Bard did not stand for election to a term of his own. In the primary election, Harley E. Knox and James B. Abbey received the most votes and advanced to a runoff election. Knox was then elected mayor with a majority of the votes in the runoff.

Candidates
Harley E. Knox, member of the San Diego City Council
James B. Abbey
Fred W. Simpson
Albert E. Flowers

Campaign
Previously elected Mayor Percy J. Benbough had died in office mid-term of natural causes. Howard B. Bard was appointed to finish the balance of Benbough's term. Bard did not stand for election for a term of his own.

On March 9, 1943, Harley E. Knox came in first in the primary election with 43.4 percent of the votes, followed by James B. Abbey in second place with 32.0 percent. Because they had the two highest vote tallies, Knox and Abbey advanced to the runoff election. On April 20, 1943, Knox came in first place in the runoff election with 68.0 percent of the vote and was elected to the office of the mayor.

Primary Election results

General Election results

References

1943
1943 California elections
1943 United States mayoral elections
1940s in San Diego
April 1943 events